The 2016 World Under-17 Hockey Challenge was an ice hockey tournament held in Sault Ste. Marie, Ontario, Canada, between October 30 and November 5, 2016. The World Under-17 Hockey Challenge is held by Hockey Canada annually to showcase young hockey talent from across Canada and other strong hockey countries. The primary venues used for the tournament are the Essar Centre and the John Rhodes Community Centre.

Challenge results

Preliminary round

Group A

Results

Group B

Results

Play Offs

Final standings

External links
Official Website

U-17
U-17
U-17
U-17
U-17
U-17
World U-17 Hockey Challenge
Ice hockey competitions in Ontario